The 2018–19 season is Ludogorets Razgrad's eight consecutive season in the Bulgarian First League, of which they are defending champions. They will also take part in the Bulgarian Cup, Supercup and will enter the UEFA Champions League first qualifying round.

Season events
On 6 June 2018, Dimitar Dimitrov left Ludogorets by mutual consent, being replaced by Paulo Autuori. Three months later Autuori also left Ludogorets by mutual consent, being replaced by Antoni Zdravkov on 9 October 2018. On 6 March 2019 Zdravkov became the third manager of the season to leave the club by mutual consent, with Stoycho Stoev being announced as his replacement.

Squad

Out on loan

Transfers

In

Out

Loans in

Loans out

Released

Competitions

Bulgarian Supercup

A Football Group

Regular stage

League table

Results summary

Results by round

Results

Championship stage

League table

Results summary

Results by round

Results

Bulgarian Cup

UEFA Champions League

Qualifying rounds

UEFA Europa League

Qualifying rounds

Group stage

Squad Statistics

Appearances and goals

|-
|colspan="14"|Players away from the club on loan:

|-
|colspan="14"|Players who appeared for Ludogorets Razgrad that left during the season:

|}

Goal Scorers

Disciplinary Record

References

Ludogorets Razgrad
PFC Ludogorets Razgrad seasons
Ludogorets Razgrad
Ludogorets Razgrad
Bulgarian football championship-winning seasons